Esterzili, Istersili or Stersili in sardinian language, is a comune (municipality) in the Province of South Sardinia in the Italian region Sardinia, located about  north of Cagliari.

Esterzili borders the following municipalities: Escalaplano, Nurri, Orroli, Sadali, Seui, Ulassai.

References 

Cities and towns in Sardinia